Susan Lynn Moran (born November 21, 1959) is an American politician from Massachusetts. She is the member to the Massachusetts Senate for the Plymouth and Barnstable district.

Moran graduated from Tufts University and Suffolk University Law School. She served as a selectman for Falmouth, Massachusetts. She won a special election for the seat on May 19, 2020. She was sworn into office on May 28.

See also
 2019–2020 Massachusetts legislature
 2021–2022 Massachusetts legislature

References

External links

 Legislative website	
 Campaign website

Living people
People from Falmouth, Massachusetts
Massachusetts Democrats
Suffolk University Law School alumni
21st-century American politicians
Selectmen in Massachusetts
Tufts University alumni
1959 births